Desmond Glover Kingsford (24 July 1914 – 10 August 1944) was a rower  who competed for Great Britain at the 1936 Summer Olympics. He was killed in action during the Second World War.

Kingsford was  the son of Douglas Hollingshead Kingsford of Calgary, Alberta, Canada, and his wife Margaret. He was educated at Cambridge University. In 1935, with his brother Annesley Kingsford  he was a member of the winning Cambridge boat in the Boat Race. He was in the winning crew again in 1936. He was also a member of the crew of  the eight which came fourth representing  Great Britain at the 1936 Summer Olympics in Berlin. In 1937 he was runner-up in the Silver Goblets at Henley Royal Regatta competing for London Rowing Club when he partnered G M Lewis.  At the 1938 British Empire Games he was a member of the English boat which won the gold medal in the eights competition.

Kingsford joined the Irish Guards and served in World War II. He was awarded the Military Cross  for action on 3 August 1944 when he commanded a combat group ordered to seize the crossroads near Saint-Charles-de-Percy. They were initially held up by machine-gun and anti-tank fire but achieved their objective on the third attempt. His medal citation noted "He handled his group with great skill and daring.  Had Captain Kingsford not persisted in his efforts to overcome this opposition, great delay would have been imposed in the execution of the Divisional plan." A week later he was killed in action at Tilly-sur-Seulles.

See also
List of Cambridge University Boat Race crews

References

1914 births
1944 deaths
Canadian male rowers
Cambridge University Boat Club rowers
Olympic rowers of Great Britain
Rowers at the 1936 Summer Olympics
Rowers at the 1938 British Empire Games
Commonwealth Games gold medallists for England
Irish Guards officers
British Army personnel killed in World War II
Commonwealth Games medallists in rowing
Recipients of the Military Cross
Sportspeople from Dublin (city)
Burials at Tilly-sur-Seulles War Cemetery
Medallists at the 1938 British Empire Games